The Alpe Gera Dam is a gravity dam on the Cormor River in a lateral valley of Valmalenco  northeast of Sondrio in the Lombardy region of Italy.

The dam was constructed between 1958 and 1964 and is best known for the concrete placement techniques used during its construction. Instead of concrete being poured into conventional monoliths, it was poured in layers with a lean mix. Next, the concrete was settled with immersed vibrators and then contraction joints were cut into the layer. These methods were not only cost-saving but instrumental in the development of roller-compacted concrete in dam construction.

See also

List of tallest dams in the world

References

Dams in Italy
Hydroelectric power stations in Italy
Gravity dams
1964 establishments in Italy
Dams completed in 1964
Roller-compacted concrete dams